Vittina is a genus of brackish water and freshwater snails with an operculum, aquatic gastropod mollusks in the subfamily Neritininae  of the family Neritidae, the nerites. 

Vittina may be also recognized as a subgenus of the genus Neritina.

Species 
Species in the genus Vittina include:
 Vittina adumbrata (Reeve, 1856)
 Vittina aquatilis (Reeve, 1856)
 Vittina coromandeliana (G. B. Sowerby I, 1836)
 Vittina cumingiana (Récluz, 1842)
 Vittina gagates (Lamarck, 1822)
 Vittina jovis (Récluz, 1843)
 Vittina natalensis (Reeve, 1855)
 Vittina pennata (Born, 1778)
 Vittina plumbea (G.W. Sowerby II, 1849)
 † Vittina pomahakaensis (Finlay, 1924)
 Vittina pouchetii (Hombron & Jacquinot, 1848)
 Vittina roissyana (Récluz, 1841)
 Vittina semiconica (Lamarck, 1822)
 Vittina serrulata (Récluz, 1842)
 Vittina smithii (W. Wood, 1828)
 Vittina solium (Récluz, 1846)
 Vittina turrita (Gmelin, 1791)
 Vittina turtoni (Récluz, 1843)
 Vittina variegata (Lesson, 1831)
 Vittina waigiensis (Lesson, 1831)
 Vittina wallisiarum (Récluz, 1850)

Taxon inquirendum
 Vittina striolata (Récluz, 1841)

References 

 Baker, H. B. (1924). Notes on the radula of the Neritidae. Proceedings of the Academy of Natural Sciences of Philadelphia. 75: 117-178, pl. 9-16.

External links
 Bourne G.C. (1909). Contributions to the morphology of the group Neritacea of aspidobranch gastropods. Part I. The Neritidae. Proceedings of the Zoological Society of London for 1908. 810–887

Neritidae